The Pu Hoat muntjac (Muntiacus puhoatensis) is a species of muntjac only known from Pu Hoat region in Vietnam, which is bordering Laos. It is sometimes considered to be conspecific with Roosevelt's muntjac, and its habitat and behavior are likely to be similar.

The Pu Hoat muntjac has only been recorded once at its type locality of Hạnh Dịch Village, Hạnh Dịch Commune, Quế Phong District, Nghệ An Province, Viet Nam.

References

Muntjac
Mammals of Asia
Mammals described in 1997